The following is a list of notable deaths in August 2002.

Entries for each day are listed alphabetically by surname. A typical entry lists information in the following sequence:
 Name, age, country of citizenship at birth, subsequent country of citizenship (if applicable), reason for notability, cause of death (if known), and reference.

August 2002

1
Hector Abdelnour, 80, Venezuelan Navy officer.
Francisco Arcellana, 85, Filipino writer, poet and journalist.
Navin Chandra Barot, 78, Indian politician.
Theo Bruce, 79, Australian long jumper (silver medal winner in men's long jump at the 1948 Summer Olympics).
Adolf Glunz, 86, German Luftwaffe flying ace during World War II.
Henry Mazer, 84, American / Taiwanese conductor and recording artist.
Moutlakgola P.K. Nwako, 79, Botswana politician and diplomat.
Don Owen, 90, American professional wrestling promoter.
Russ Rebholz, 93, American football player.
Jack Tighe, 88, American baseball coach.
Geoffrey Paulson Townsend, 91, English architect.

2
Joe Allison, 77, American songwriter, radio and television personality and record producer.
Roberto Cobo, 72, Mexican actor (Los Olvidados, The Place Without Limits).
Avraham Givelber, 92, Israeli politician.
Kevin Hardiman, 87, Australian rules footballer.
Ilona Kolonits, 80, Hungarian documentary film director and news correspondent.
Roy Kral, 80, American jazz pianist and vocalist, congestive heart failure.
Magda László, 90, Hungarian operatic soprano.
Sammy Onyango, 41, Kenyan soccer player, traffic accident.

3
Edward Brodney, 92, American artist, known for his drawings and paintings of World War II.
Kathleen Hughes-Hallett, 84, Canadian Olympic fencer.
Peter Miles, 64, American actor.
Carmen Silvera, 80, British television and theatre actress (Dad's Army, 'Allo 'Allo!).
John G. Zimmerman, 74, American photographer, an innovator in sports photojournalism.

4
William R. Crawford Jr., 74, American diplomat and ambassador (Yemen, Cyprus).
Millard Lang, 89, American soccer and lacrosse player.
Mike Payne, 40, American Major League Baseball pitcher (Atlanta Braves), EEE.
Friedel Sellschop, 72, South African scientist.

5
Jes Peter Asmussen, 73, Danish Iranologist, his research focused on the religions of Iran.
Peter Costigan, 67, Australian journalist and Lord Mayor of Melbourne from 1999 to 2001.
Josh Ryan Evans, 20, American actor (Passions, How the Grinch Stole Christmas) and stunt performer (Baby Geniuses), complications from a heart condition.
Chick Hearn, 85, television and radio announcer for the Los Angeles Lakers basketball team since 1960.
Willis Hudlin, 96, American baseball player (Cleveland Indians, Washington Senators, St. Louis Browns, New York Giants).
Franco Lucentini, 82, Italian writer (The Sunday Woman).
Darrell Porter, 50, American baseball player (Milwaukee Brewers, Kansas City Royals, St. Louis Cardinals, Texas Rangers).
Junius Scales, 85, American activist and leader of the Communist Party of the United States of America.
Winifred Watson, 95, English writer (Miss Pettigrew Lives for a Day).

6
Jim Crawford, 54, Scottish motor racing driver, liver failure.
Edsger Dijkstra, 72, computer scientist.
John Fage, 81, British historian.
Justin Meyer, 63, American vintner and enologist, heart attack.
Christopher Speer, 28, U.S. Army combat medic and an armed member of, K.I.A.

7
Dominick Browne, 4th Baron Oranmore and Browne, 100, British aristocrat.
Molly Harrison, 92, English museum curator and author, hypertension.
Roy LoPresti, 73, American aeronautical engineer.
Al Smith, 56, Canadian ice hockey player, pancreatic cancer.

8
Bernard Chidzero, 75, Zimbabwean politician, Finance Minister (1983–1995).
Bruce Johnston, 63, American criminal, cancer.
Chen Junsheng, 74, Chinese politician.
John N. McLaughlin, 83, American lieutenant general, heart attack.
Charles Poletti, 99, American lawyer and politician.
Kapitolina Rumiantseva, 76, Russian Soviet realist painter and graphic artist.
Doris Buchanan Smith, 68, American author children's books, ALS.

9
George Alfred Barnard, 86, British statistician, known for his work on quality control and the likelihood principle.
Don Chastain, 66, American actor and singer (Alfred Hitchcock Hour, Colt .45, The Rockford Files, Hawaii Five-O).
Trần Độ, 78, Vietnamese politician and Lieutenant General of the People's Army of Vietnam.
Ruud van Feggelen, 78, Dutch water polo player and coach (bronze medal in water polo at the 1948 Summer Olympics).
Jake Fendley, 73, American professional basketball player (Northwestern University, Fort Wayne Pistons).
Ray D. Free, 92, Major General in the U.S. Army Reserves.
Erna Furman, 76, Austrian-American child psychoanalyst.
Meredith Gardner, 89, American linguist and codebreaker.
Peter Matz, 73, American musician, composer, arranger and conductor, lung cancer.
Bruce McCaffrey, 63, Canadian politician.
Paul Samson, 49, English guitarist, cancer.

10
Robert Frank Borkenstein, 89, American police officer and inventor of the breathalyzer.
Colin Eggleston, 60, Australian film and television director and writer (Long Weekend, Homicide).
Michael Houser, 40, American guitarist, pancreatic cancer.
Kristen Nygaard, 75, Norwegian computer scientist and politician, heart attack.
Eugene Odum, 88, American biologist.
Mordecai Waxman, 85, American rabbi, prominent conservative, known for confronting Pope John Paul II.
Doris Wishman, 90, American film director, screenwriter and producer, known for low-budget "B" movies.

11
Nancy Chaffee, 73, American tennis player (1950, 1951, 1952 singles and doubles U.S. Indoor Champion), cancer.
Per Cock-Clausen, 89, Danish figure skater (13-time Danish National Champion, figure skating at the Winter Olympics: 1948, 1952).
Mick Dunne, 73, Irish sports journalist.
Jiří Kolář, 87, Czech poet and writer.
Hermann Pálsson, 81, Icelandic language scholar and translator.
Galen Rowell, 61, wilderness photographer, adventure photojournalist and climber, plane crash.
Richard Wood, Baron Holderness, 81, British politician (Member of Parliament for Bridlington).

12
Michael De-la-Noy, 68, British journalist and author (The Queen Behind the Throne).
Sir John Rennie, 85, British diplomat.
Enos Slaughter, 86, American baseball player (St. Louis Cardinals, New York Yankees, Kansas City Athletics) and member of the MLB Hall of Fame.
Étienne Trocmé, 77, French historian and theologian.
Dame Marjorie Williamson, 89, British educator, physicist and university administrator.

13
Jack Creel, 86, American baseball player (St. Louis Cardinals).
Ulises Ramos, 82, Chilean footballer and manager.
Al Vande Weghe, 86, American competition swimmer and Olympic silver medalist.
Celso Nogoy Guevarra, 79, 1st Bishop of Balanga (November 8, 1975–April 8, 1998).

14
Peter R. Hunt, 77, British film editor (Dr. No, Goldfinger) and director (On Her Majesty's Secret Service).
Mary Pickford, 100, British neuroendocrinologist.
Larry Rivers, 78, American painter.
Neal Travis, 62, New Zealand journalist and novelist.
Dave Williams, 30, American singer of Drowning Pool, heart failure.

15
Heinz Bauer, 74, German mathematician.
Jesse Brown, 58, American United States Marine and United States Secretary of Veterans Affairs.
George Agbazika Innih, 63, Nigerian army general and politician.
Arnie Moser, 87, American baseball player (Cincinnati Reds).
Kyle Rote, 73, American gridiron football player.
King-lui Wu, 84, Chinese-American architect, early advocate of the importance of daylight in architecture.
Haim Yosef Zadok, 88, Israeli jurist and politician.

16
Edith Addams, 95, Belgian-American Olympic fencer (Belgium), costume designer for theater, ballet and film and a theatrical producer.
Janusz Bardach, 83, Polish-American Siberian gulag survivor and renowned plastic surgeon.
Allan George Bromley, 55, American computer scientist, historian of computing.
Jeff Corey, 88, American actor (Butch Cassidy and the Sundance Kid, In Cold Blood, Little Big Man).
Martin Deutsch, 85, Austrian-American physicist and professor of physics at MIT, known as the discoverer of positronium.
Morgan "Bill" Evans, 92, American horticulturalist and Disney landscape designer, transformed eighty acres of Anaheim into Disneyland.
Abu Nidal, 65, Palestinian terrorist.
Sergey Perets, 32, Russian police officer.
Ola Belle Reed, 85, American singer.
John Roseboro, 69, American baseball player (Brooklyn/Los Angeles Dodgers, Minnesota Twins, Washington Senators).
Stephen Yokich, 66, American labor union activist and President of the United Auto Workers.

17
Jimmy Bloodworth, 85, American baseball player (Washington Senators, Detroit Tigers, Pittsburgh Pirates, Cincinnati Reds, Philadelphia Phillies), heart attack.
John Charles, 57, English footballer, cancer.
Glyndwr Renowden, 73, Welsh Anglican priest, Chaplain-in-Chief of the RAF.
Rushyendramani, 85, Indian singer, dancer, and actress.
Benjamin Thompson, 84, American architect.
Tony Zemaitis, 67, British guitar maker.

18
Turpal-Ali Atgeriyev, 33, Chechen rebel leader and top official in the rebel government.
Jonnie Barnett, 56, American musician and songwriter ("The Chain of Love"), appeared in Nashville and Cheech and Chong's Next Movie.
Carter L. Burgess, 85, American public servant, business executive and diplomat (Assistant Secretary of Defense, Ambassador to Argentina).
Dame Elizabeth Chesterton, 86, British architect and town planner.
Edward Crew, 84, British air marshal and an ace nightfighter pilot in World War II.
David Keynes Hill, 87, British biophysicist.
Dean Riesner, 83, American screenwriter (Dirty Harry, Play Misty for Me, The Enforcer).

19
Alastair Gordon, 6th Marquess of Aberdeen and Temair, 82, British botanical artist and art critic.
Eduardo Chillida, 78, Spanish Basque sculptor.
Irving Copi, 85,  American philosopher, logician and textbook author (Introduction to Logic).
Satchidananda Saraswati, 87, Indian religious teacher, spiritual master and yoga adept.
Sunday Silence, 16, thoroughbred race horse, winner of the Kentucky Derby and the Preakness Stakes.

20
Wesley Bennett, 89, American basketball player.
Chris Columbus, 100, American jazz drummer.
Robert H. Dedman Sr., 76, American businessman and philanthropist.
Augustine Geve, Solomon Islands Cabinet Minister, assassinated.
John Willett, 85, British journalist and translator of the works of Bertolt Brecht into English.

21
O. A. Bushnell, 89, American microbiologist, professor and writer.
Bob Cristofani, 81, Australian cricketer.
Jimmy Deane, 81, British Trotskyist and one of the founders of the Revolutionary Socialist League.
Pereji Solomon, 92, Indian bishop.
Joseph H. Wales, 94, American ichthyologist, professor and pathologist.

22
Mikayil Abdullayev, 80, Azerbaijani painter.
Victor Nendaka Bika, 79, Congolese politician.
Mark Bucci, 78, American Broadway, film and television composer (The 13 Clocks, Seven in Darkness, Human Experiments).
Kevin Coghlan, 72, Australian rules footballer.
Bruce Duncan Guimaraens, 66, Portuguese wine maker.
Teodor Keko, 43, Albanian writer, journalist, and politician.
Richard Lippold, 87, American sculptor.
Harold Lowes, 75, Australian lawyer and politician.
Abe Zvonkin, 92, Canadian track and field athlete.

23
Stafford Beer, 75, British theorist, consultant and author, known for his work in operational research and management cybernetics.
Dennis Fimple, 61, American character actor (Petticoat Junction, Gomer Pyle, U.S.M.C., Green Acres).
Emily Genauer, 91, American art critic.
Robert van Scoyk, 74, American television writer, producer and story editor.
Wayne Simmons, 32, American Football player, single-car crash.
Hoyt Wilhelm, 80, American baseball player (New York Giants, Baltimore Orioles, Chicago White Sox) and a member of the MLB Hall of Fame.

24
Ted Ashley, 80, American film studio executive (chairman of Warner Bros) and talent agent, complications following heart surgery.
Alan Brash, 89, New Zealand clergyman.
Thomas H. Brown, 85, American politician.
Hugh Cruttwell, 83, English teacher of drama and principal of the Royal Academy of Dramatic Art.
Nikolay Guryanov, 93, Russian Orthodox  priest.
Cornelis Johannes van Houten, 82, Dutch astronomer.
Johnny Wilson, 86, American professional football player (Case Western Reserve University, Cleveland Rams).

25
Per Anger, 88, Swedish diplomat, known for shielding thousands of Hungarian Jews from Nazi death camps.
Audrey Barker, 69, British artist.
Raúl Chibás, 86, Cuban politician, military officer and close associate of Fidel Castro, defected to U.S. in 1960.
Dorothy Hewett, 79, Australian poet, playwright and novelist.
Raju, 41, Sri Lankan member of the Liberation Tigers of Tamil Eelam (LTTE).
Åke Söderlund, 77, Swedish racewalking athlete.
William Warfield, 82, American concert bass-baritone singer and actor, complications following neck injuries from a fall.

26
Aslambek Abdulkhadzhiev, 40, Chechen warlord, killed in action.
Walter J. D. Annand, 79, Scottish aeronautical engineer, academic and author.
Thomas Gordon, 84, American clinical psychologist.
Vincent Massey, 75, Australian biochemist and enzymologist.
Georg Werner, 98, Swedish swimmer (bronze medal in men's 4 x 200 metre freestyle relay at the 1924 Summer Olympics).
Harlow Wilcox, 59, American session musician from Norman, Oklahoma, heart attack.

27
Lawrence Batley, 91, English businessman and philanthropist, a pioneer in the wholesale cash and carry business in the U.K.
Edwin Sill Fussell, 80, American scholar of English literature.
A. S. Gnanasambandan, 85, Indian Tamil language writer, scholar and literary critic.
George Mitchell, 85, Scottish musician (The Black and White Minstrel Show).
John S. Wilson, 89, American music critic for The New York Times for four decades.

28
David Bierk, 58, American-Canadian artist.
Fritz Feldmann, 86, Swiss rower (men's coxed eights rowing at the 1936 Summer Olympics).
Kay Gardner, 62, American musician, composer, author, and Dianic priestess, heart attack.
Jerri Mumford, 93, British-Canadian servicewoman during WWII.
George Riley, 79, Canadian politician.
Rudolf Schnackenburg, 88, German Catholic priest and New Testament scholar.

29
Betty Forbes, 85, New Zealand track and field athlete.
Phoebe Gilman, 62, Canadian-American author and illustrator, leukemia.
Lance Macklin, 82, British racing driver.
Paul Tripp, 91, children's musician, author, songwriter, and actor.
Anatoliy Yulin, 73, Soviet (Belarusian) Olympic athlete (men's 400 metres hurdles: 1952, 1956, men's 4 × 400 metres relay: 1956).

30
Thomas J. Anderson, 91, American publisher and politician.
Mariya Bayda, 80, Russian medical orderly during World War II.
Maia Berzina, 91, Russian geographer, cartographer and ethnologer.
Pepsi Bethel, 83, American jazz dancer, choreographer and dance troupe leader (Pepsi Bethel Authentic Jazz Dance Theater).
Dave Dalby, 51, American professional football player (UCLA, Oakland/Los Angeles Raiders).
J. Lee Thompson, 88, British film director (The Guns of Navarone, Cape Fear, Conquest of the Planet of the Apes), congestive heart failure.
Horst Wendlandt, 80, German film producer.
Zaid ibn Shaker, 67, Jordanian politician and soldier (Prime Minister of Jordan).

31
Farhad, 58, Iranian pop, rock, and folk musician, hepatitis C.
Lionel Hampton, 94, American jazz musician.
Lucas Johnson, 61, American visual artist, heart failure.
Martin Kamen, 89, American scientist.
George Porter, Baron Porter of Luddenham, 81, British Nobel Prize winner in chemistry.

References 

2002-08
 08